Charles Bowser (born October 2, 1959) is a former American football linebacker who played four seasons in the National Football League for the Miami Dolphins.

Early life and career
Bowser played his college career at Duke University, setting the school's single season and career sacks record at 17.5 and 22, respectively.  Bowser graduated from Plymouth High School, located in Plymouth, North Carolina in 1978.  Charles Bowser also played a role as part of the Miami Dolphins Killer Bees Defense of the 1980s.  Other members included Lyle Blackwood, Glenn Blackwood, Bob Baumhower, Bob Brudzinski, Kim Bokamper, Bill Barnett, Doug Betters, and honorary member AJ Duhe.

References

1959 births
Living people
American football linebackers
Duke Blue Devils football players
Miami Dolphins players
People from Plymouth, North Carolina
Players of American football from North Carolina
African-American players of American football
21st-century African-American people
20th-century African-American sportspeople
Ed Block Courage Award recipients